The Mexican Democratic Party (PDM) was an ultra-Catholic social conservative political party in Mexico that existed between 1979 and 1997. At its height in 1982, the party had over 500,000 active voters and 12 seats in the Mexican Chamber of Deputies (Cámara de Diputados).

Rise

Origins 

The PDM had its origin in the Manuel Torres Bueno wing of the right-wing Catholic and the clerical fascist National Synarchist Union (UNS), who fought openly against anti-Catholic articles of the Constitution of 1917, particularly in the states of Jalisco, Aguascalientes, Querétaro, Guanajuato and Michoacán, the states in which the Cristero War was fought from 1926 to 1929.

Whilst the UNS faded after the 1940s it continued as a local group and was boosted, along with a number of other opposition groups, by a series of electoral reforms during the 1970s that introduced an element of proportional representation into the electoral system. As a result of these, the UNS, the activities of which were largely confined to Guanajuato, was reconstituted as a new political party called the Mexican Democratic Party. The party was formed against a backdrop of renewed importance for the Catholic Church in Mexican society, with a growth in the influence of groups such as Opus Dei whilst the opposition National Action Party (PAN) self-identified as Catholic. The two parties differed however in that the PDM drew support from peasants whilst the PAN was firmly the province of the urban middle classes, and the PAN had a more moderate platform than the PDM.

Electoral performance 
In the 1979 legislative elections, the PDM gained 10 seats in the Chamber of Deputies. It increased its representation to 12 seats in the 1982 election. It was in the old UNS heartlands that the PDM obtained its greatest electoral presence, prevailing in several important municipalities like Lagos de Moreno in Jalisco or the city of Guanajuato.

Although the PDM managed to gain seats in the Chamber of Deputies, it was a very small opposition party compared to the PAN, having gained only 2.3% of the nationwide vote during the 1982 general election. Even so, if its seat increase from the 1979 congressional election to the 1982 election is considered, the PDM had the second-highest (after the PAN) percentage increase of total votes out of all the political parties in Mexico.

Decline

In the presidential elections of 1988 the party started to lose support. In the presidential elections of 1994, the party supported the candidature of Pablo Emilio Madero and was renamed National Opposition Union (UNO) after having joined with several small conservative organizations. It lost its registry. It again recovered it in 1996, but in the 1997 elections, it lost its registry again.

Many of their militants conformed in 1999 the new Social Alliance Party, which did not obtain notable political presence in the country either.

In 2013, former members of the party began to lay the groundwork for the re-registration of the party to take part in mid-term elections in 2015.

Important members

Party presidents 

Ignacio González Golláz
Víctor Atilano Gómez
Mariano Gaxiola

Presidential candidates 

1982: Ignacio González Golláz
1988: Gumersindo Magaña
1994: Pablo Emilio Madero

Electoral history

Presidential elections

Congressional elections

Chamber of Deputies

See also
Mexican synarchism
List of political parties in Mexico

References

Political parties established in 1979
Political parties disestablished in 1997
Defunct political parties in Mexico
Catholic political parties
Far-right politics in Mexico
Far-right political parties
Mexican nationalism
Conservative parties in Mexico
National syndicalism
National conservative parties
Social conservative parties
Neo-fascist parties